Steven Glen Gage (born May 10, 1964) is a former American football safety in the National Football League (NFL) for the Washington Redskins from 1987 to 1988.  He played college football at the University of Tulsa and was drafted in the sixth round of the 1987 NFL Draft.

1964 births
Living people
American football safeties
People from Claremore, Oklahoma
Players of American football from Oklahoma
Tulsa Golden Hurricane football players
Washington Redskins players